Kim Kyu-won is a South Korean biologist.

Education
Kim graduated from Seoul National University in 1976, and the Masters programme at the Korea Advanced Institute of Science and Technology in 1978, before going on to study a Ph.D. in Biochemistry at the University of Minnesota in Minneapolis, United States, concluding in 1985.

Work
Kim's post-doctorate career began as a Postdoctoral Fellow at the Department of Cancer Genetics, Dana–Farber Cancer Institute, Harvard Medical School between 1985 and 1987.
Academic Appointment
Assistant Professor, Associate Professor, Professor, Department of Molecular Biology, Pusan National University, Korea (1987 - 2000)
Director, Research Institute of Genetic Engineering, Pusan National University, Korea (1994 - 1998)
Professor, College of Pharmacy, Seoul National University, Korea (2000)
President, The Korean Society for Vascular Biology (2001 - 2003)
Full member, The Korean Academy of Science and Technology (2001)
Vice-chairman, The Korean Cancer Association (2011 - 2012)

Technical reports and conference/event proceedings
8th Cerebral Vascular Biology International Conference, Invited lecturer, Japan (2008)
12th International Symposium Signaling at Blood Brain and Blood Retinal Barrier, Invited lecturer, United Kingdom (2009)
The Second Pacific Symposium on Vascular Biology, Invited speaker, South Korea (2011)
70th Annual Meeting of the Japanese Cancer Association (JCA2011), Chairman/ Organizer, Japan (2011)
The XXVth International Symposium on Cerebral Blood Flow, Metabolism, and Function, Invited lecturer, Spain (2011)
Seoul Brain Barrier Symposium, Organizer, South Korea (2012)

References

External links
 NeuroVascular Coordination Research Center

1952 births
Living people
South Korean molecular biologists
Seoul National University alumni
KAIST alumni
University of Minnesota College of Biological Sciences alumni
Recipients of the Ho-Am Prize in Medicine